Gans is a town in Sequoyah County, Oklahoma, United States. It is part of the Fort Smith, Arkansas-Oklahoma Metropolitan Statistical Area. The population was 312 at the 2010 census, an increase of 50 percent over the figure of 208 recorded in 2000.

History
Gans was originally a dispersed settlement in the Sequoyah District of the Cherokee Nation in Indian Territory known as Jack Town. It was renamed Gann in the late 19th century for three brothers, Charlie, Swimmer, and Tom Gann, who settled there. The Kansas City, Pittsburg and Gulf Railroad built a line through the area during 1895-6 and requested that the name be changed to Gans, since it already had two other locations named Gann.

Gans incorporated in the Cherokee Nation in 1902. It lost this status in 1933. It reincorporated in 1953. The town was seriously damaged by a tornado in 1957, but later rebuilt.

Geography
Gans is located at  (35.387207, -94.693871). The post office, established in 1896, was also renamed Gans.

Demographics

As of the census of 2000, there were 208 people, 79 households, and 57 families living in the town. The racial makeup of the town was 70.67% White, 0.96% African American, 26.44% Native American, 0.48% from other races, and 1.44% from two or more races. Hispanic or Latino of any race were 0.48% of the population.

There were 79 households, out of which 38.0% had children under the age of 18 living with them, 51.9% were married couples living together, 19.0% had a female householder with no husband present, and 27.8% were non-families. 25.3% of all households were made up of individuals, and 16.5% had someone living alone who was 65 years of age or older. The average household size was 2.63 and the average family size was 3.12.

In the town, the population was spread out, with 31.3% under the age of 18, 8.2% from 18 to 24, 26.9% from 25 to 44, 14.9% from 45 to 64, and 18.8% who were 65 years of age or older. The median age was 30 years. For every 100 females, there were 98.1 males. For every 100 females age 18 and over, there were 78.8 males.

The median income for a household in the town was $17,344, and the median income for a family was $23,750. Males had a median income of $24,375 versus $12,188 for females. The per capita income for the town was $8,922. About 25.9% of families and 27.1% of the population were below the poverty line, including 36.0% of those under the age of eighteen and 25.8% of those 65 or over.

Notable people
Cal Smith, country music star
Bryant "Big Country" Reeves, played in the NBA for the Vancouver Grizzlies from 1995 to 2001.

References

External links
 Encyclopedia of Oklahoma History and Culture - Gans

Towns in Oklahoma
Towns in Sequoyah County, Oklahoma
Fort Smith metropolitan area